Sandesh Shandilya  is an Indian film composer, musician, and singer, working in Bollywood, most known for his work in films like Kabhi Khushi Kabhie Gham (2001), Chameli, Road, Uff Kya Jadoo Mohabbat Hai and Socha Na Tha. 
 
His 2001 music album Piya Basanti won the International viewers' choice award at the 2001 MTV Video Music Awards. His teacher, Ustad Sultan Khan along with K.S.Chithra sang the song Piya Basanti for him on this album.

He took basic training of music from maestro Ustad Sultan Khan who was a noted Sarangi player too.

Album

Filmography

References

External links
 
 Sandesh Shandilya at Bollywood Hungama

1979 births
Living people
Indian film score composers